A Question of Balance is the sixth album by The Moody Blues, released in 1970. The album was an attempt by the group to strip down their previously lush, psychedelic sound in order to be better able to perform the songs in concert. The album reached No. 1 in the United Kingdom and No. 3 in the United States.

In March 2006, the album was remastered into SACD format and repackaged with six extra tracks. In 2008, a remaster for standard audio CD was issued with the same bonus tracks.

“Melancholy Man” was covered by Gökhan Abur, former Turkish pop singer and present weatherman, as “Yalnız Adam” (“Lonely Man") for his 45 rpm "Yalnız Adam/Palyaçodan Başka Neyim?" in 1972

Pop Matters critic Sean Murphy rated "Melancholy Man" as the 26th best progressive rock song of all time, praising its restraint and saying that "it might be the best thing the band ever did."

Track listing

Personnel
The Moody Blues
 Justin Hayward - vocals, acoustic & electric guitars, mandolin
 John Lodge - vocals, bass
 Ray Thomas - vocals, flute, tambourine
 Graeme Edge - drums, percussion, whispered vocal on "Don't You Feel Small"
 Mike Pinder - vocals, Mellotron, Moog synthesizer, piano, harpsichord, maracas, acoustic guitar

Charts

Certifications

References

External links
"A Question Of Balace" at discogs

The Moody Blues albums
1970 albums
Deram Records albums
Threshold Records albums
Albums produced by Tony Clarke (record producer)